Dai was a short-lived state from 228 BC to 222 BC during the Warring States period of Chinese history. Prince Zhao Jia, older brother of King Youmiu of Zhao, fled with the remnant forces to Dai Commandery after the conquest of Zhao and was proclaimed the new king of Zhao. His rump state was conquered in the year 222 BC by Qin during its campaigns against Yan. The ruins of his capital are preserved in present-day Yu County, Hebei, as "Dai King City" (代王城).

See also
 King of Dai
 Zhao Jia

References

Citations

Bibliography
 Li and Zheng, page 184
  
 .

Ancient Chinese states
Former countries in East Asia
220s BC
3rd century BC in China
Former monarchies of East Asia